Winston Francis Groom Jr. (March 23, 1943 – September 17, 2020) was an American novelist and non-fiction writer. He is best known for his  novel Forrest Gump (1986), which became a cultural phenomenon after being adapted as a 1994 film of the same name, starring Tom Hanks. After the film was released, gaining a high box office and winning numerous awards, Groom's novel sold more than one million copies worldwide. Groom wrote a sequel, Gump and Co., published in 1995. His last novel was El Paso (2011).

He also wrote a total of fifteen non-fiction works on such varied subjects as the American Civil War and World War I, including five multiple biographies.

Early life and education 
Groom was born in Washington, D.C., the son of Ruth (Knudsen), an English teacher, and Winston Francis Groom, a lawyer at the Pentagon. He and his family returned to Mobile, Alabama where the senior Groom practiced law. 

Winston Groom was raised in Mobile County, Alabama, where he attended the private University Military School (now known as UMS-Wright Preparatory School). His earliest ambition was to become a lawyer like his father. Groom attended the University of Alabama, where he became a member of Delta Tau Delta International Fraternity and the Army ROTC. While serving as a literary editor in college, he settled on a new ambition to become a writer. He graduated with Omicron Delta Kappa honors in 1965.

Groom served in the United States Army from 1965 to 1967, including a tour of duty in the Vietnam War (from 66–67).  Most of his service time was spent with the Fourth Infantry Division.

Career

Upon his return from Vietnam, Groom worked as a reporter for the Washington Star, a Washington, D. C. newspaper covering the U.S. Department of Justice and U.S. federal courts. Groom resigned and moved to New York to pursue a career in writing novels. Groom's first novel was Better Times Than These, published in 1978. Better Times Than These was about a rifle company in the Vietnam War whose patriotism and lives are shattered. According to P.J O'Rourke, journalist and political satirist, and a friend of Groom, Better Times Than These was "the best novel written about the Vietnam War."

His next novel As Summers Die (1980) received better recognition. His book Conversations with the Enemy (1982) follows an American soldier who escapes from a POW camp in Vietnam and takes a plane back to the United States. Fourteen years later he is arrested for desertion. Conversations with the Enemy was a 1984 finalist for the Pulitzer Prize for General Non-Fiction.

In 1985, Groom moved back to Mobile, Alabama, where he began to work on the novel Forrest Gump. Years before, Groom's elderly father had told him about a mentally disabled boy he had known as a child. Groom began writing Forrest Gump the same day, and within six weeks finished the novel. Forrest Gump was published in 1986.

Several years later, it was adapted by screenwriter Eric Roth as a 1994 film of the same name, starring Tom Hanks in the title role of Forrest Gump. The film received six Academy Awards and numerous others; its popularity propelled the novel to best-seller status, and it sold 1.7 million copies worldwide.  

Groom disputed accounting by Paramount Pictures related to profits from the film. He contended the company used Hollywood accounting to deflate profitability numbers; as a result, Groom received no payment, although he held a 3% profit share in it. 

In November 2011, Groom published his latest history, Kearny's March: The Epic Creation of the American West, 1846–1847. Groom describes how Brigadier General Stephen W. Kearny's quest for westward adventure coincided with the expansionist desires of U.S. President James K. Polk. The book opens in mid-summer 1846, in the period of the Texas Annexation, the Mexican–American War, and brewing issues related to the American Civil War fifteen years in the future. Groom weaves into Kearny's March mountain man Kit Carson, Brigham Young and his Mormon followers, and members of the Donner party.

In 2016, Groom published El Paso, his first novel in nearly 20years.

At the time of his death in 2020, Groom was waiting for publication of The Patriots, his biography of American leaders John Adams, Alexander Hamilton, and Thomas Jefferson.

Personal life
Groom was married three times, and was divorced twice. He had one daughter, and three stepchildren.

Groom died from a suspected heart attack at his home in Fairhope on September 17, 2020, at age 77.

Works

Novels 

As Summers Die (1980), 

Forrest Gump (1986); Knopf Doubleday Publishing Group, reprint 2012, 
Gone the Sun (1988); 1996, 
Gump and Co. (1995)  
Such a Pretty, Pretty Girl (1998) 
El Paso (2016)

Nonfiction 
 Conversations with the Enemy: the story of P.F.C. Robert Garwood (1982, with Duncan Spencer)   
 Shrouds of Glory: From Atlanta to Nashville: The Last Great Campaign of the Civil War (1995)  
 The Crimson Tide: An Illustrated History of Football at the University of Alabama (2002)
 A Storm in Flanders: The Triumph and Tragedy on the Western Front (2002)  
 1942: The Year that Tried Men's Souls (2004)  
 Patriotic Fire: Andrew Jackson and Jean Laffite at the Battle of New Orleans (2006)  
 
 The Crimson Tide: The Official Illustrated History of Alabama Football, National Championship Edition (2010)
 Kearny's March: The Epic Creation of the American West, 1846-1847  (2011)  
 Ronald Reagan: Our 40th President (2012)
  (2012), 
 The Aviators: Eddie Rickenbacker, Jimmy Doolittle, Charles Lindbergh, and the Epic Age of Flight (2013) 
 The Generals: Patton, MacArthur, Marshall, and the Winning of World War II (2015) 
 The Allies: Roosevelt, Churchill, Stalin, and the Unlikely Alliance That Won World War II (2018)
 The Patriots: Alexander Hamilton, Thomas Jefferson, John Adams, and the Making of America (2020), published posthumously.

See also
List of people with surname Groom

References

External links 
  at the Southern Literary Review
 Audio interview with Winston Groom at National Review Online
A Storm in Flanders: The Ypres Salient, 1914–1918—Tragedy and Triumph on the Western Front, Booknotes interview with Groom, September 1, 2002

 

1943 births
2020 deaths
20th-century American non-fiction writers
20th-century American novelists
21st-century American historians
United States Army personnel of the Vietnam War
American male non-fiction writers
American male novelists
American military writers
Historians from Alabama
Military personnel from Washington, D.C.
Novelists from Alabama
People from Baldwin County, Alabama
University of Alabama alumni
Writers from Mobile, Alabama
Writers from Washington, D.C.
20th-century American male writers